This is the discography for American jazz musician Lee Konitz.

Albums

As leader/co-leader 
 1949–50: Lee Konitz and Stan Getz, The New Sounds (Prestige, 1951)[10"]
 1949–50: Subconscious-Lee (Prestige, 1955) – a.k.a. Lee Konitz with Tristano, Marsh and Bauer
 1951: The New Sounds featuring Miles Davis (Prestige)[10"] - reissued on Conception in 1956
 1953: Lee Konitz Plays with the Gerry Mulligan Quartet with Gerry Mulligan (Pacific Jazz, 1957)
 1953: Lee Konitz Plays (Disques Vogue, 1953)[10"]
 1954: Lee Konitz at Storyville (Storyville, 1954) – live
 1954: Konitz (Storyville, 1954)
 1954: Lee Konitz in Harvard Square (Storyville, 1955)
 1955: Lee Konitz with Warne Marsh (Atlantic, 1955)
 1956: Lee Konitz featuring Hans Koller, Lars Gullin, Roland Kovac (Swingtime, 1989)
 1956: Inside Hi-Fi (Atlantic, 1956)
 1957: The Real Lee Konitz (Atlantic, 1957) – live
 1957: Very Cool (Verve, 1957)
 1957: Tranquility (Verve, 1957)
 1958: An Image: Lee Konitz with Strings (Verve, 1958)
 1959: Live at the Half Note (Verve, 1994) – live
 1959: Lee Konitz Meets Jimmy Giuffre with Jimmy Giuffre (Verve, 1959)
 1959: You and Lee (Verve, 1959)
 1961: Motion (Verve, 1961)

 1966: Modern Jazz Compositions from Haiti (Impulse!, 1979)
 1967: The Lee Konitz Duets (Milestone, 1968)
 1968: Alto Summit  with Pony Poindexter et al. (MPS, 1968)
 1968: European Episode (Campi, 1968)
 1968: Impressive Rome with Martial Solal (Campi, 1968)
 1968: Stereokonitz (RCA, 1968)
 1969: Peacemeal (Milestone, 1970)
 1971: Spirits (Milestone, 1971)
 1973: Altissimo  with Gary Bartz, Jackie McLean and Charlie Mariano (Philips, 1973)
 1974: In Concert with Chet Baker (India Navigation, 1982) – live
 1974: Jazz à Juan (SteepleChase, 1977) – live
 1974: I Concentrate on You: A Tribute to Cole Porter with Red Mitchell  (SteepleChase, 1974)
 1974: Lone-Lee (SteepleChase, 1975)
 1974: Satori (Milestone, 1975)
 1975: Oleo (Sonet, 1975)
 1975: Chicago 'n All That Jazz (Groove Merchant, 1975)
 1975: Windows with Hal Galper (SteepleChase, 1976)
 1975: Warne Marsh Quintet: Jazz Exchange Vol. 1  with Warne Marsh (Storyville, 1976) – live
 1975: Live at the Montmartre Club: Jazz Exchange Vol. 2 with Warne Marsh (Storyville, 1977) – live
 1975: Warne Marsh Lee Konitz: Jazz Exchange Vol. 3 with Warne Marsh (Storyville, 1985) – live
 1975: The Unissued 1975 Copenhagen Studio Recordings (Storyville, 1997)
 1976:  Jazz a Confronto 32  (Horo, 1976)
 1976: Lee Konitz Meets Warne Marsh Again with Warne Marsh (Pausa, 1977) – live
 1976:  The Lee Konitz Nonet  (Roulette, 1977)
 1976: Figure & Spirit (Progressive, 1977)
 1977: Pyramid with Paul Bley and Bill Connor (Improvising Artists, 1978)
 1977: The Lee Konitz Quintet (Chiaroscuro, 1977)
 1977: Lee Konitz Nonet (Chiaroscuro, 1977)
 1977: French Concert  with the Shelly Manne Quartet (Galaxy, 1979) – live
 1977: Duplicity with Martial Solal (Horo, 1978)
 1977–78: Tenorlee (Choice, 1978)
 1979: Yes, Yes, Nonet (SteepleChase, 1979)
 1979: Four Keys with Martial Solal et al. (MPS, 1979)
 1979: Live at Laren (Soul Note, 1984) – live
 1979: Seasons Change with Karl Berger (Circle, 1980) 
 1980: Heroes  with Gil Evans (Verve, 1991)
 1980: Anti-Heroes with Gil Evans (Verve, 1991)
 1980: Live at the Berlin Jazz Days 1980  with Martial Solal (MPS, 1982) – live
 1981: Live in Genoa 1981 with Art Farmer (Tramonti, 2013) – live
 1982: High Jingo with His West Coast Friends (Atlas, 1982)
 1982: Toot Sweet with Michael Petrucciani (Owl, 1982) – live
 1983: Dovetail (Sunnyside, 1983)
 1983: Art of the Duo with Albert Mangelsdorff (Enja, 1988)
 1983: Glad, Koonix! (Dragon, 1986) – live
 1983:  Dedicated to Lee  with Lars Sjösten Octet (Dragon, 1984)
 1983: Star Eyes, Hamburg 1983 with Martial Solal (HatOLOGY, 1998) – live
 1984:  Wild as Springtime featuring Harold Danko (GFM, 1997)
 1986?: Medium Rare (Label Bleu, 1986)
 1986: Ideal Scene (Soul Note, 1986)
 1987: Anniversary! (EmArcy, 1989) – live
 1987: The New York Album (Soul Note, 1988)
 1988: Blew with The Space Jazz Trio  (Philology, 1989)
 1988: Solitudes with Enrico Pieranunzi (Philology, 1988)
 1988: Round and Round (Musicmasters, 1988)
 1989?: In Rio (MA, 1989)
 1989: Konitz in Denmark with Jens Søndergaard Quartet (Rightone, 1989)
 1988-89: Frank-Lee Speaking (West Wind, 1992)
 1990: S'Nice with Frank Wunsch (Nabel, 1990)
 1990: Zounds (Soul Note, 1991)
 1990: Once Upon a Line (Musidisc, 1995) – live
 1990: Swiss Kiss with Alain Guyonnet Tentet (TCB, 1994)
 1991: Lullaby of Birdland (Candid, 1994) – live
 1988-92: Saxophone Dreams with Netherlands Metropole Orchestra (Koch Jazz, 1997)
 1992: Lunasea with Peggy Stern  (Soul Note, 1992)
 1992: Unleemited with Kenny Werner  (Owl, 1994)
 1992: Leewise with the Jazzpar All Star Nonet (Storyville, 1993)
 1992: Steps Towards a Dream with John Pål Inderberg (Odin, 1995)
 1992: Jazz Nocturne (Evidence, 1994)
 1992: Lee Konitz Meets Don Friedman with Don Friedman (Insights, 1994)
  1992: So Many Stars with Tiziana Ghiglioni and Stefano Battaglia (Philology, 1993)
 1993: The Jobim Collection with Peggy Stern (Philology, 1993)
 1993: Very Fool with Massimo Salvagnini Quartet (High Tide, 2001)
 1993: A Venezia with Orchestra Il Suono Improvviso (Philology, 1993)
 1993: Free with Lee (Philology, 1995)
 1993: Italian Ballads, Volume 1 with Stefano Battaglia (Philology, 1993)
 1993: Speakin' Lowly with Renato Sellani (Philology, 1994)
 1993: All the Way (The Soft Way) with Renato Sellani (Philology, 1998)
 1993: Rhapsody (Evidence, 1993)
 1993: Rhapsody II (Evidence, 1994)
 1994: We Thought About Duke with Franz Koglmann (HatART, 1995) 
 1994: Haiku with Rudi Mahall et al. (Nabel, 1995)
 1995?: Live at the Manhattan Jazz Club with Jeanfrançois Prins Trio (GAM Records, 1995) – live
 1995: Brazilian Rhapsody (Venus, 1995)
 1995: Breaths and Whispers with Umberto Petrin (Philology, 1995) 
 1995: Thingin' with Don Friedman and Attila Zoller (HatOLOGY, 1996) – live
 1995: The Frankfurt Concert with Frank Wunsch (West Wind, 1997)
 1996: It's You (SteepleChase, 1996)
 1996: Strings for Holiday: A Tribute to Billie Holiday (Enja, 1996)
 1996: Inside Cole Porter (Philology, 1998)
 1996: Inside Rogers with Franco D'Andrea (Philology, 1998)
 1996: Body and Soul with Gary Foster (Camerata, 1996)
 1996: Dearly Beloved (SteepleChase, 1996)
 1996: Unaccompanied Live in Yokohama (P.S.F., 1997) – live
 1996: Alone Together  with Brad Mehldau and Charlie Haden (Blue Note, 1997) – live
 1996: Subconscious-Lee with Johannes Schaedlich  (Summit, 1998)
 1997: Self Portrait (Philology, 1998)
 1997: L'Age Mur with Enrico Rava (Philology, 1998)
 1997:  Dig Dug Dog  (Columbia, 1997)
 1997: Out of Nowhere with Paul Bley (SteepleChase, 1998)
 1997: RichLee!  with Rich Perry (SteepleChase, 1998)
 1997: Dialogues with Bert Van Den Brink Trio (Challenge, 1998)
 1997: Another Shade of Blue (Blue Note, 1999) – live
 1998: Three Guys with Steve Swallow and Paul Motian (Enja, 1999)
 1998: Tender Lee (For Chet) (Philology, 1999)
 1999: Sound of Surprise (RCA Victor, 1999)
 1999: Dig-It  with Ted Brown (SteepleChase, 1999)
 1999: Pride (SteepleChase, 1999)
 1999: Live at Birdland Neuberg with Kenny Wheeler Quartet (Double Moon, 2000) – live
 2000: Play French Impressionist Music from the Turn of the 20th Century with the Axis String Quartet (Palmetto, 2000)
 2000: Some New Stuff (DIW, 2000)
 2000: In Italy Vol.3: Lee Konitz at the New Mississippi Jazz Club (Philology, 2002) – live
 2000: Live-Lee with Alan Broadbent (Milestone, 2004) – live
 2000: More Live-Lee with Alan Broadbent (Milestone, 2004) – live
 2000: Prisma (QFTF, 2018) – live
 2000: Parallels (Chesky, 2001)
 2001: In Italy Vol.1: Duas Contas with Irio de Paula (Philology, 2002)
 2001: In Italy Vol.2: Outra vez with Barbara Casini (Philology, 2002)
 2002: In Italy Vol.4: Suite For Paolo with Stefano Bollani (Philology, 2003)
 2002: A Day in Florence with Roberto Gatto (Philology, 2003)
 2003: BargaLee with the Orchestra BargaJazz (Philology, 2013) – live

 2004: Lee Konitz - Ohad Talmor String Project, Inventions with Ohad Talmor et al. (OmniTone, 2006)
 2005: New Nonet (OmniTone, 2006) – live
 2006: Organic-Lee with Gary Versace (SteepleChase, 2006) 
 2006: Lee Konitz - Ohad Talmor Big Band, Portology with Ohad Talmor et al. (OmniTone, 2007)
 2006: Infant eyes: The Music of Wayne Shorter with Claudio Fasoli et al. (Philology, 2007)
 2007: Deep Lee with  Minsarah (Enja, 2008)
 2008?: GRACEfulLEE with Grace Kelly (Pazz, 2008)
 2008-09: Duos with Lee with Dan Tepfer (Sunnyside, 2009)
 2009: Lee Konitz New Quartet, Live at the Village Vanguard (Enja, 2010) – live
 2009: Live at Birdland with Brad Mehldau, Charlie Haden and Paul Motian (ECM, 2011) – live
 2010: First Meeting: Live in London, Volume 1  with Dan Tepfer, Michael Janisch and Jeff Williams (Whirlwind, 2014) – live
 2012: Enfants Terribles with Bill Frisell, Gary Peacock and Joey Baron (HighNote, 2012) – live
 2012: Costumes Are Mandatory with Ethan Iverson, Larry Grenadier and Jorge Rossy (HighNote, 2013)
 2015: Frescalalto with Kenny Barron, Peter Washington and Kenny Washington (Impulse!, 2017)
 2010-16: Decade with Dan Tepfer (Verve, 2018)

Compilation 
 From Newport to Nice (Philology, 1992)
 Sound-Lee (Membran, 2004)

As sideman 
With Chick Corea
 1981: Woodstock Jazz Festival 1 with Anthony Braxton, Pat Metheney, Jack DeJohnette and Miroslav Vitous (Douglas Music, 1997)
 1981: Woodstock Jazz Festival 2 with Anthony Braxton, Pat Metheney, Jack DeJohnette and Miroslav Vitous (Douglas Music, 1997)

With Miles Davis
 1947-48: The Miles Davis Tuba Band with Lennie Tristano, Why Do I Love You? Rare Broadcasts 1947–48 (Natasha, 1993)
 1949-50: Birth of the Cool (Capitol, 1957) – compilation
 1957: Miles Ahead (Columbia, 1957)

With Lennie Tristano
 1954-55: Lennie Tristano (Atlantic, 1956)
 1949: Crosscurrents (Capitol, 1972) – reissued as part of Intuition (1996)

With Stan Kenton
 1947-51: City of Glass (Capitol, 1951)
 1952: New Concepts of Artistry in Rhythm (Capitol, 1953)
 1951-53: This Modern World (Capitol, 1953)
 1953: Sketches on Standards (Capitol, 1953)
 1953: Portraits on Standards (Capitol, 1953)
 compilation: Popular Favorites by Stan Kenton (Capitol, 1953)
 compilation: The Kenton Era (Capitol, 1955)

With others
 1947: Claude Thornhill and His Orchestra, The Uncollected Claude Thornhill and His Orchestra (Hindsight, 1994)
 1951: Ralph Burns and His Orchestra, Free Forms (1951, Mercury)[10" SP]
 1956: Metronome All-Stars, Metronome All-Stars 1956 (Clef, 1956)
 1957: Gil Evans, Gil Evans & Ten (Prestige, 1958)
 1957: Gerry Mulligan, The Gerry Mulligan Songbook (World Pacific, 1958)
 1959: Warne Marsh, The Art of Improvising (Revelation, 1974) – live
 1966: Dave Pike, The Doors of Perception (Vortex, 1970) – live
 1968: Attila Zoller, Zo-Ko-Ma (MPS, 1968)
 1972: Charles Mingus, Charles Mingus and Friends in Concert (Columbia, 1972) – live
 1973-74: Dave Brubeck, All The Things We Are (Atlantic, 1976)
 1974-75: Andrew Hill, Spiral (Arista, 1975)
 1975: Warne Marsh Quintet, Jazz Exchange (Storyville, 1976) – live
 1975: Hal Galper, Windows (SteepleChase, 1976)
 1977: Bill Evans, Crosscurrents (Fantasy, 1978)
 1980: Martial Solal, Live at the Berlin Jazz Days (MPS, 1982) – live
 1983: Martial Solal, Star Eyes, Hamburg 1983 (HatOLOGY, 1998) – live
 1984: Max Roach, It's Christmas Again (Soul Note, 1984)
 1990: Frank Wunsch Quartet, S'Nice (Nabel, 1990)
 1991: Lars Sjosten Quartet, Friends (Dragon, 1992)
 1992: Kenny Werner, Unleemited (Owl, 1994)
 1993: Orchestra Il Suono Improvviso, A Venezia (Philology, 1993)
 1993: Renato Sellani, Vol. 1: Speakin' Lowly (Philology, 1994)
 1993: Renato Sellani, Vol. 2: Minority (All The Way) (Philology, 1998)
 1995: Umberto Petrin, Breaths and Whispers (Homage to Alexander Scriabin) (Philology, 1995)
 1995: John Pl Indreberg, Step Towards a Dream (Odin, 1997)
 1995: Don Friedman with Attila Zoller, Thingin'  (HatOLOGY, 2000)
 1996: Kenny Wheeler, Angel Song (ECM, 1997)
 1996: Franco D'Andrea, Inside Rodgers (Philology, 1998)
 1997: Rich Perry, RichLee! (SteepleChase, 1998)
 1998?: Gerry Mulligan All-Star Tribute Band, Thank You, Gerry! (Arkadia Jazz, 1998)
 1998?: Diane Hubka, Haven't We Met? (Challenge, 1998)
 1999?: Jeanfrançois Prins, All Around Town (TCB, 1999)
 2000: Brandenburg State Orchestra, Prisma - composed by Guenter Buhles (QFTF, 2018)
 2000?: The Axis Quartet, Play French Impressionist Music from the Turn of the Twentieth Century (Palmetto, 2000)
 2002?: Judy Niemack, About Time (SONY Jazz, 2002)
 2002: Matt Wilson, Gong with Wind Suite (SteepleChase, 2002)
 2005: Riccardo Arrighini, The Soprano Sax Album: Standards (Philology, 2006)
 2005: Brian Dickenson, The Glenn Gould Session (Philology, 2006)
 2006: Francois Théberge, Soliloque (Effendi, 2008)
 2008: Jakob Bro, Balladeering (Loveland, 2009)
 2009?: Dan Tepfer, Duos with Lee (Sunnyside, 2009)
 2010?: Marcel·lí Bayer, Nonitz Featuring Lee Konitz (Quadrant, 2013)
 2011?: Jakob Bro, Time (Loveland, 2011)
 2012: Jakob Bro, December Song (Loveland, 2013)
 2015-16: Dan Tepfer, Decade (Verve, 2018)

References

External links
 

discographies of American artists
Jazz discographies